Boeckella is a genus of copepods in the family Centropagidae.

Species
The genus Boeckella contains 49 species, of which five are listed as vulnerable species on the IUCN Red List – the Australian endemics B. bispinosa, B. geniculata, B. nyoraensis, B. shieli, and B. calcaris from Bolivia and Peru.

Boeckella ambigua Percival, 1937
Boeckella antiqua Menu-Marque & Balseiro, 2000
Boeckella asymmetrica Searle, 1914
Boeckella bergi Richard, 1897
Boeckella bispinosa Bayly, 1967
Boeckella brevicaudata (Brady, 1875)
Boeckella calcaris (Harding, 1955)
Boeckella coronaria Henry, 1922
Boeckella delicata Percival, 1937
Boeckella denticornis Brehm, 1950
Boeckella diamantina Menu-Marque & Zúñiga, 1994
Boeckella dilatata G. O. Sars, 1904
Boeckella erubescens (Brehm, 1935)
Boeckella fluvialis Henry, 1922
Boeckella geniculata Bayly, 1964
Boeckella gibbosa (Brehm, 1935)
Boeckella gracilipes Daday, 1901
Boeckella gracilis (Daday, 1902)
Boeckella hamata Brehm, 1928
Boeckella klutei (Brehm, 1926)
Boeckella lacuna Fairbridge, 1945
Boeckella longicauda Daday, 1901
Boeckella longisetosa G. W. Smith, 1909
Boeckella major Searle, 1938
Boeckella meteoris Kiefer, 1928
Boeckella michaelseni (Mrázek, 1901)
Boeckella minuta G. O. Sars, 1896
Boeckella montana Bayly, 1964
Boeckella nyoraensis Searle, 1912
Boeckella occidentalis Marsh, 1906
Boeckella opaqua Fairbridge, 1945
Boeckella palustris (Harding, 1955)
Boeckella pilkililli Quinlan & Bayly, 2017
Boeckella poopoensis Marsh, 1906
Boeckella poppei (Mrázek, 1901)
Boeckella propinqua G. O. Sars, 1904
Boeckella pseudochelae Searle, 1912
Boeckella robusta G. O. Sars, 1896
Boeckella rubra G. W. Smith, 1909
Boeckella saycei G. O. Sars, 1908
Boeckella shieli Bayly, 1985
Boeckella silvestri (Daday, 1901)
Boeckella symmetrica G. O. Sars, 1908
Boeckella tanea Chapman, 1973
Boeckella thomseni Brehm, 1937
Boeckella timmsi Bayly, 1998
Boeckella titicacae Harding, 1955
Boeckella triarticulata (G. M. Thomson, 1883)
Boeckella vallentini (T. Scott, 1914)

Taxonomic history
The genus was originally described by G. M. Thomson as "Boeckia", in honour of Jonas Axel Boeck (1833–1873). That name proved, however, to be a junior homonym of Boeckia, a genus of Amphipoda, and so Jules de Guerne and Jules Richard provided it with the replacement name Boeckella in 1889.

References

Centropagidae
Taxonomy articles created by Polbot